Trumpler 16 (Tr 16) is a massive open cluster that is home to some of the most luminous stars in the Milky Way galaxy. The cluster has one star visible to the naked eye from the tropics southward, Eta Carinae.

Description
However,  appears by far the brightest object, both because it is brighter in visual wavelengths and because it is embedded in nebulosity which exaggerates the luminosity.   is very hot and emits most of its radiation at ultraviolet wavelengths.

Carina OB1
The spectral types of the stars indicate that  formed by a single wave of star formation. Because of the extreme luminosity of the stars formed, their stellar winds push away the clouds of dust, similar to the Pleiades. In a few million years, after the brightest stars have exploded as supernovae, the cluster will slowly die away.  includes most of the stars in the eastern portion of the  association.

Gaia Data Release 2
Gaia Data Release 2 provides parallaxes for many stars considered to be members of Trumpler 16. Many of the other supposed members show significantly different parallaxes and may be foreground or background objects. Therefore, the distance of Trumpler 16 is assumed to be around 2,600 pc, significantly further than the accurately-known distance of η Carinae.

Gallery

References

Further reading

External links
 

Carina Nebula
Open clusters
Carina (constellation)
Trumpler catalog
Star-forming regions